The 2015 Tennessee train derailment  occurred on July 2, 2015. A CSX Transportation train derailed at Maryville, Tennessee. The train was carrying toxic chemicals, leading to an evacuation of over 5,000 people.

Accident
On July 2, 2015, a CSX Transportation freight train carrying hazardous materials derailed at Maryville, Tennessee. The train was traveling from Cincinnati, Ohio, to Waycross, Georgia. It comprised two locomotives and 57 freight cars, at least two of which were carrying acrylonitrile. Other railcars in the consist were carrying LPG. Three of the railcars were reported to have caught fire. An evacuation of all within a  radius was ordered. Those evacuated were offered accommodation at the Heritage High School, where Red Cross personnel provided assistance, or at the Foothills Mall. Roads closed included U.S. Route 321. Fifty-two people were injured by inhaling fumes from the chemicals on the train. Twenty-five of them, including seven police officers, were hospitalized at the Blount Memorial Hospital, Maryville. 

CSX said it was helping residents find lodging. They also said there were at least three cars carrying the chemical, although only one was burning.

Investigation
The National Transportation Safety Board (NTSB) has not opened an investigation into the accident, although that option remains open to them.

The Federal Railroad Administration (FRA) lists a report from CSX stating that the cause of the accident was an overheated journal or roller bearing. It also states the number of injured as 197 and total damages as $272,000.

References 

Train
Tennessee
Accidents and incidents involving CSX Transportation
Tennessee
Railway accidents and incidents in Tennessee
Tennessee
Derailments in the United States